Dowlatabad-e Dasht-e Seh Chah (also Romanized as Dowlatābād-e Dasht-e Seh Chāh; also known as Dowlatābād-e Seh Chāh) is a village in Now Bandegan Rural District, Now Bandegan District, Fasa County, Fars Province, Iran. At the 2006 census, its population was 503, in 116 families.

References 

Populated places in Fasa County